Chicamocha may refer to:

 Chicamocha Canyon, second-largest canyon in the world, cut by the
 Chicamocha River, Boyacá and Santander Departments, central Colombia
 Chicamocha National Park (PANACHI), national park surrounding the canyon
 Chicamocha National Park cable car, cable car in the national park
 Chicamocha Fault, seismic fault crossing the canyon
 Chicamocha Schist, Late Cambrian geologic formation outcropping in the canyon
 , province in the upper course of the river
 , hospital in Bucaramanga